Na Piarsaigh is a Gaelic Athletic Association club situated on the north side of Limerick City, Ireland. It was founded in 1968.  Following their 1–15 to 3–11 victory in the 2022 Limerick Intermediate Football Championship over St Senan's, Na Piarsaigh are one of Four dual senior club in hurling and Gaelic football in Limerick. The club currently field five adult teams three in hurling (senior, Intermediate & Junior) and two in football (Senior & Junior), the most of any club in Limerick.  In 2011, Na Piarsaigh won their first ever Munster Senior Club Hurling Championship.
In November 2015, Na Piarsaigh won their third Munster Senior Club Hurling Championship after a 2–18 to 2–11 win against Ballygunner in the final.
On St Patrick's Day, 2016 Na Piarsaigh won their first ever All-Ireland Senior Club Hurling Championship beating Ruairí Óg, Cushendall 2–25 to 2–14 in Croke Park, becoming the first ever Limerick club to do so. In December 2022 Na Piarsaigh won the Limerick Intermediate Hurling Championship beating Croagh/Kilfinny 1-19 to 0-14, earning promotion to the Limerick Premier Intermediate Hurling Championship for 2023 and are the only club in Limerick to field teams in both the Limerick Senior Hurling Championship & Limerick Premier Intermediate Hurling Championship.

Club formation 
The formation of Na Piarsaigh GAA Club was initiated in the industrial boom time of the 1960s and the inaugural meeting was held in the Ardhú House Hotel on Tuesday 16 January 1968 when the attendance included Rev.Fr.J.Browne C.C and three officials of the Limerick County Board – Jackie O'Connell, Chairman; Tom Boland, Secretary and Mick O'Brien, Treasurer.

Opening the meeting, Mr. Noel Drumgoole said that the fine attendance was most heartening and an indication of the interest in the formation of the GAA club in the parish. He paid tribute to Treaty Sarsfields for their work in promoting Gaelic games on the north side of the city, but stressed that in view of the considerable housing development in areas such as Greystones, Highfield, Mayorstone, Clareview and Caherdavin a new club, which initially would cater solely for underage players, was a very definite necessity. Many children were not given the opportunity of playing Gaelic games or any other games in fact, due to the deplorable lack of playing pitches and open spaces in the area.

Mr. Jackie O'Connell expressed his delight at the formation of the club and promised the full support of the county board. He outlined details of the various grants which would be forthcoming for the purchase and development of a playing field and mentioned that particular consideration is given by the Central Council of the GAA, by way of additional grants to clubs in city areas.

Fr. Browne spoke at length on the importance of providing recreational facilities for the youth of the parish.

After many suggestions were made it was unanimously agreed that the club would be called "Cumann Na Piarsaigh".

It was agreed that for 1968 Na Piarsaigh would enter teams in the City Bord na nÓg competitions in the under 14, 15 and 16 grades in both hurling and football. Street leagues and challenge games were also arranged to ensure that the boys interested in Gaelic games would be afforded the chance to do so.

Pending the purchase of land, the club decided to avail of the offer of a fine playing pitch in Caherdavin. In accordance with top level GAA policy the meeting decided that Na Piarsaigh would place particular emphasis on social activities for the members and towards this end it was envisaged that a pavilion and Pitch and Putt course would be included in their proposed pitch and complex.

The following officers were elected to guide the destiny of Na Piarsaigh in their initial year.
 President: Rev.Fr.Browne, C.C. Holy Rosary Parish. Chairman; Mr. Noel Drumgoole, Greystones 
 Vice-Chairman: Mr. Eddie O'Connor, Highfield. Secretary; Mr.Tom McInerney, Caherdavin.
 Treasurer: Mr. Mossy O'Grady, Mayorstone.
 Committee: Messrs. Michael Cotter, Greystones; Donal Curtin, Mayorstone; Jimmy Custy, Clareview; Oliver Moran, Clareview; Frank Cleary, Caherdavin; Jim Beary, O'Callaghan Strand; Michael O'Brien, Shelbourne Road; Paddy O'Malley, Shelbourne Park; Flan O'Neill, Greystones; Jack Ryan, Greystones; John Rowsome, Shelbourne Park.

Underage development 
Na Piarsaigh has traditionally well-developed juvenile structures which is reflected by the success of the underage teams at both divisional and county level. The pinnacle of this success was the U14  winning team of 1984. As with most GAA clubs, underage development is complemented by well-established links with the local schools. Most of Na Piarsaigh's younger players attend Scoil Chríost Rí Caherdavin or John F. Kennedy memorial school. There is also a strong link to local secondary school, Ardscoil Rís, with Na Piarsaigh players making significant contributions to the very successful Dr. Harty Cup panels of 2010, 2011 and 2014.

Honours 
Hurling
 All-Ireland Senior Club Hurling Championship (1) – 2016
 Munster Senior Club Hurling Championship (4) – 2011, 2013, 2015, 2017	
 Limerick Senior Hurling Championship (7) – 2011, 2013, 2015., 2017, 2018, 2020, 2022
 Limerick Intermediate Hurling Championship (1) – 1994,2022
 Limerick Junior Hurling Championship (2) – 1990, 2016
 Limerick Junior B Hurling Championship (1) – 1991
 Limerick Under-21 Hurling Championship (12) – 1989, 1990, 1993, 1995, 2004, 2010, 2012, 2013, 2014, 2015, 2016, 2017
 Limerick Minor Hurling Championship (4) – 1989, 1992, 2011, 2016
 Limerick Under-16 Hurling Championship (9) – 1985, 1987, 1990, 1993, 1999, 2007, 2011, 2012, 2013
    Limerick Under 15 Hurling Championship (1) 2022
 All Ireland Féile na nGael Championship (1) – 1984
 Limerick Under-14 Féile na nGael (9) – 1983, 1984, 1985, 1986, 1987, 1988, 2005, 2011, 2013
 Limerick Under-14 Championship (11) – 1983, 1985, 1986, 1987, 1988, 1999, 2000, 2007, 2011, 2012, 2014
 Limerick Under-12 Championship (5) – 1981, 1982, 1984, 1986, 2003

Football
 Limerick Intermediate Football Championship (3) – 1975, 2014, 2022
 Limerick Junior A Football Championship (1) – 2006
 Limerick Under-21 B Football championship (1) – 2011
 Limerick Under-21 Football Championship (2) – 1973, 1997
 Limerick Minor Football Championship (2) – 1981, 1994
 Limerick Under-16 Football Championship (6) – 1975, 1983, 1984, 1986, 1992, 1993
 Limerick Under-14 Football Championship (3) – 1983, 1984, 1992, 2013(B), 2020(b)
 Limerick Under-12 Football Championship (3) – 1984, 1985, 2003

Inter-county hurlers
Paul O' Farrell
Nicky O'Farrell
Damien Quigley (GAA Hurling All-Star Recipient 1994)
Shane O'Neill –  Former Na Piarsaigh hurling Manager
David Hennessy
Kieran Breen
 Padraic Kennedy
 Mike Casey
 Cathal King – Former club Hurling Captain
 Alan Dempsey
 William O'Donoghue – Current Club Hurling Captain (GAA Hurling All Star 2021)
Shane Dowling (GAA Hurling All-Star Recipient 2014)
 David Dempsey
David Breen
 Adrian Breen
Kevin Downes
 Peter Casey ( GAA Hurling All Star 2021)
Ronan Lynch
Conor Boylan
Jerome Boylan

Inter-county footballers

Tom Browne
Pat Murray
John Power
Ger Mullane
Cathal Minihane
Eoin Hogan Limerick & New York
Cian Cody
Brendan Donnelly
Maurice Horan former Limerick Senior Football Manager
Kieran Daly
Gordon Brown
Ronan Lynch
Eoghan Sherlock

References

External links
Official Na Piarsaigh website
Official Limerick website
Limerick on Hoganstand

Gaelic games clubs in County Limerick
Hurling clubs in County Limerick
Gaelic football clubs in County Limerick